Shakespeare's Sister can refer to:

 Shakespears Sister, an alternative pop group featuring Siobhan Fahey
 "Shakespeare's Sister" (song), a 1985 song by The Smiths
 A section of the essay A Room of One's Own by Virginia Woolf
 Joan Shakespeare, the sister of William Shakespeare